The 2006–07 Greek Basket League season was the 67th season of the Greek Basket League, the highest tier professional basketball league in Greece. Panathinaikos finished in first place in the regular season, and won the championship, via the playoffs.

Teams

Regular season

Standings 

Pts=Points, P=Matches played, W=Matches won, L=Matches lost, F=Points for, A=Points against, D=Points difference

Results

Playoffs

Bracket

Quarterfinals

(1) Panathinaikos vs. (8) Maroussi 
Panathinaikos win the series 2-0

(2) Aris vs. (7) Olympia Larissa 
Aris win the series 2-0

(3) Olympiacos vs. (6) PAOK 
Olympiacos win the series 2-1

(4) Panionios vs. (5) Panellinios 
Panionios win the series 2-0

Semifinals

(1) Panathinaikos vs. (4) Panionios 
Panathinaikos win the series 3-0

(2) Aris vs. (3) Olympiacos 
Olympiacos win the series 3-2

3rd place

(2) Aris vs. (4) Panionios 
Aris win the series 3-2

Finals

(1) Panathinaikos vs. (3) Olympiacos 
Panathinaikos win the series 3-2

Game 1

Game 2

Game 3

Game 4

Game 5

Final league table

Greek League Best Five

League leaders regular season 

Points

Rebounds

Assists

Steals

Blocks

Source: Galanis Sports Data

League leaders playoffs 

Points

Rebounds

Assists

Steals

Blocks

Source: Galanis Sports Data

External links 
 Official HEBA Site
 Official Hellenic Basketball Federation Site
 A1 League at Sportime magazine (Greek)
 Galanis Sports Data

Greek Basket League seasons
 
Greek